Sverre Blix (29 August 1885 – 17 February 1967) was a Norwegian footballer. He played in one match for the Norway national football team in 1910.

References

External links
 
 

1885 births
1967 deaths
Norwegian footballers
Norway international footballers
Footballers from Oslo
Association football midfielders